Golf on USA is the umbrella title for USA Network's coverage of the PGA Tour and other golf events. in the United States. USA Network's own coverage of the PGA Tour ended after the 2006 season. USA also covered the early rounds of The Masters Tournament from 1982 until 2007. The network also carried the Ryder Cup Matches in some form from 1989 until 2010, except for the 2008 event.

Beginning in 2022, USA returned to golf coverage, airing NBC's early round coverage of The Open Championship, U.S. Open, and their women's counterparts, replacing Golf Channel.

Coverage overview
USA was also, separately, the cable home of the Masters Tournament from 1982 to 2007. USA's sister network, Universal HD, broadcast The Masters in high-definition (one of the first golf tournaments to ever hold that distinction).

The Masters Tournament
The USA Network began first and second round Masters coverage in 1982, which was also produced by the CBS production team. This was the first ever cable coverage for one of the golf majors. Initially, the USA Network provided Thursday and Friday coverage for 2 hours live each day along with a prime time replay.  In 1995, USA expanded the Thursday/Friday coverage to 2.5 hours each day. In 2003 and 2004, both CBS and USA televised the Masters commercial-free. In 2005, USA increased the Thursday/Friday coverage to 3 hours.

Other events covered by USA
The Shark Shootout, which began in 1989 as the RMCC Invitational, was originally broadcast in the United States by the USA Network and CBS, with USA broadcasting the first round on a tape-delayed basis, and CBS handling the second round live. Not all the country saw the final round live, as CBS' commitment to the NFL only allowed part of the country to see the round as it takes place, with the rest of the U.S. seeing the event beginning at 4 p.m. Eastern Time. In 2007, the event was moved to December, and was broadcast live by both Golf Channel and NBC.

Bob Hope Chrysler Classic - From 2003 to 2006, USA Network covered the early action. Prior to 2007, USA and ESPN/ABC consistently covered all four courses used for the event, with the primary camera crew covering PGA West, but live coverage still emanating from the other courses.  However, when Golf Channel took over coverage, the network only assigned live coverage to PGA West (both the Palmer and Nicklaus courses). All other courses used did not receive live coverage at all, with an hourly highlights package sent in and played, but none of it live.  This has been the approach consistently taken by Golf Channel in regards to tournaments with multiple courses, including the Pebble Beach National Pro-Am and the Walt Disney World Golf Classic.  However, since NBC has taken over the production of PGA Tour events on Golf Channel, coverage of all courses on multi-course events has returned.
Buick Invitational  
FBR Open  
AT&T Pebble Beach Nat'l Pro-Am  
Nissan Open  
Chrysler Classic of Tucson   
Ford Championship at Doral  
Honda Classic  
Bay Hill Invitational presented by MasterCard  
BellSouth Classic  
Verizon Heritage  
Shell Houston Open  
Zurich Classic of New Orleans  
Wachovia Championship   
EDS Byron Nelson Championship  
Bank of America Colonial   
Senior PGA Championship  
FedEx St. Jude Classic  
Barclays Classic  
Booz Allen Classic   
Buick Championship  
Cialis Western Open  
Ford Senior Players Championship  
John Deere Classic  
B.C. Open presented by Turning Stone Resort  
U.S. Bank Championship in Milwaukee  
Buick Open   
The INTERNATIONAL  
Deutsche Bank Championship 
Ryder Cup
Chrysler Classic of Greensboro 
Fry's.com Open  
Chrysler Championship  
Merrill Lynch Shootout   
Target World Challenge

The end of USA's coverage
In early 2006, it was announced that USA was outbid by Golf Channel for its early-round PGA Tour rights, with USA's final season being 2006.  NBC/Universal, parent company of USA Network, traded away the network's Friday Ryder Cup coverage through 2012 to ESPN for the rights to sign Al Michaels.  However, USA did renew its Masters contract for an additional year. USA would televise the 2007 Masters before being outbid by ESPN for future coverage. The 2007 Masters was also the final event for USA Sports, which was dissolved into parent NBC Sports after the tournament. All future sports telecasts on USA would use NBC's graphics and personalities.

The Ryder Cup contract, which stipulated cable coverage air on USA, was still controlled by NBC even after it granted ESPN the rights to Friday cable coverage (normally the only day of the event covered on cable). However, in 2010, rain on Friday pushed the singles matches to Monday, necessitating that they air on cable. With NBC having granted only Friday rights to ESPN, the singles matches aired on USA.  Four months later, NBC merged with Golf Channel, making Golf Channel NBC's primary cable outlet for golf.

Return

In November 2021, it was announced that early-round coverage of the Open Championship, U.S. Open, and their women's counterparts, would move to USA Network beginning in 2022.

Commentators

Phil Blackmar
Bob Carpenter - Carpenter anchored USA's coverage of the Masters beginning in 1986.
Fran Charles - From 2002 to 2006, Charles was the host of the weekly golf show, PGA Tour Sunday on USA Network, serving as lead anchor for studio segments during PGA Tour events.
John Cook
Jim Gallagher Jr. 
Mike Hulbert - During the 2003 Buick Open, he interviewed eventual champion Jim Furyk from what appeared to be a snack bar during a rain delay while covering the early rounds on USA Network. Other players (who were not visible, nor identified) were in the room at the time of Furyk's interview and proceeded to throw popcorn at them from off camera as the interview progressed. At one point Furyk even held up a golf towel to block the popcorn as it got worse, and he stated that: "It looks like it's pick on Hubby day!"
Peter Kostis - In addition to his CBS duties, he was from 1989-2004, the lead golf analyst for the USA Network.
Bill Macatee - Beginning 1990, he anchored coverage of the PGA Tour on the USA Network.
Gary McCord  
Jennifer Mills
Bill Patrick - He worked for USA from 1998 through 2006 as host of the U.S. Open tennis and PGA Tour. He also did play-by-play and reporting for USA's PGA Tour coverage.
Larry Rinker
Ted Robinson
Tim Rosaforte
Patty Sheehan
Jim Simpson - Simpson was the lead play-by-play man for USA's coverage of the 1989 Ryder Cup (working alongside Gary McCord and Ben Wright among others).
Stina Sternberg
Chris Wragge - In December 2000, while still with NBC Sports and Houston's KPRC, Wragge joined USA Sports as the on-site correspondent for PGA Tour Sunday, the PGA Tour's leading broadcast partner.
Ben Wright

References

External links
PGA TOUR GOLF – USA Network (archived 30 February 2010)

1990s American television series
2000s American television series
USA Network Sports
USA Network
USA Network original programming
1982 American television series debuts
2010 American television series endings
American sports television series